James Birdsall (1783 – July 20, 1856) was an American politician and a U.S. Representative from New York.

Biography
Born in 1783 in New York State, Birdsall studied law and was admitted to the bar in 1806. He married  Rizpah Steere, and they had two sons, Henry Huntington, and Maurice.

Career
Birdsall was the first lawyer to settle in Norwich, New York and became surrogate of Chenango County, New York in 1811.

Elected as a Democratic-Republiccan to the Fourteenth Congress, Birdsall was United States Representative for the fifteenth district of New York from March 4, 1815, to March 3, 1817.

A member of the New York State Assembly (Chenango County) in 1827, Birdsall was also one of the incorporators of the Bank of Chenango.  He moved to Fenton, Michigan, in 1839 and later to Flint, Michigan.

Death
Birdsall died in Flint, Genesee County, Michigan, on July 20, 1856 (age about 73 years). He is interred at Glenwood Cemetery, in Flint Michigan.

References

External links

1783 births
1856 deaths
People from Norwich, New York
Members of the New York State Assembly
Democratic-Republican Party members of the United States House of Representatives from New York (state)
19th-century American politicians
People from Fenton, Michigan